The following outline is provided as an overview of and topical guide to Chhattisgarh:

Chhattisgarh –  state in central India. The state was formed on 1 November 2000 by partitioning 27 Chhattisgarhi-speaking southeastern districts of Madhya Pradesh.

General reference

Names 
 Common English name: Chhattisgarh
 Pronunciation: 
 Official English name: Chhattisgarh
 Nickname(s): 
 Adjectival(s): Chhattisgarhi
 Demonym(s): Chhattisgarhis
 Abbreviations and name codes
 ISO 3166-2 code: IN-CT
 Vehicle registration code: CG

Rankings (amongst India's states) 

 by population: 17th
 by area (2011 census): 10th
 by crime rate (2015): 11th
 by gross domestic product (GDP) (2014): 16th
by Human Development Index (HDI): 
by life expectancy at birth: 
by literacy rate:

Geography of Chhattisgarh 

Geography of Chhattisgarh
 Chhattisgarh is: an Indian state
 Population of Chhattisgarh: 27,928,015
 Area of Chhattisgarh: 135,194.5 km2 (52,198.9 sq mi) 
 Atlas of Chhattisgarh

Location of Chhattisgarh 
 Chhattisgarh is situated within the following regions:
 Northern Hemisphere
 Eastern Hemisphere
 Eurasia
 Asia
 South Asia
 India
 Time zone:  Indian Standard Time (UTC+05:30)

Environment of Chhattisgarh

Protected areas of Chhattisgarh 

 Semarsot Wildlife Sanctuary
 Tamor Pingla Wildlife Sanctuary

Natural geographic features of Chhattisgarh

Regions of Chhattisgarh

Ecoregions of Chhattisgarh 

 Eastern Highlands moist deciduous forests
 Central Deccan Plateau Dry Deciduous Forests
 Chhota-Nagpur dry deciduous forests
 Narmada Valley dry deciduous forests
 Northern dry deciduous forests

Administrative divisions of Chhattisgarh

Districts of Chhattisgarh 

Districts of Chhattisgarh

 Balod district 
 Baloda Bazar district 
 Balrampur district 
 Bastar district 
 Bemetara district 
 Bijapur district 
 Bilaspur district 
 Dantewada district
 Dhamtari district  
 Durg district 
 Gariaband district 
 Janjgir–Champa district 
 Jashpur district 
 Kanker district 
 Kabirdham district 
 Kondagaon district 
 Korba district 
 Koriya district 
 Mahasamund district 
 Mungeli district 
 Narayanpur district 
 Raigarh district 
 Raipur district 
 Rajnandgaon district
 Surguja district 
 Sukma district
 Surajpur district
Gaurela pendra marwahi

Municipalities of Chhattisgarh 

Municipalities of Chhattisgarh

 Capital of Chhattisgarh: Raipur
 Cities of Chhattisgarh

Demography of Chhattisgarh 

Demographics of Chhattisgarh

Government and politics of Chhattisgarh 

Politics of Chhattisgarh

 Form of government: Indian state government (parliamentary system of representative democracy)
 Capital of Chhattisgarh: Raipur
 Elections in Chhattisgarh

Union government in Chhattisgarh 
 Rajya Sabha members from Chhattisgarh
 Chhattisgarh Pradesh Congress Committee
 Indian general election, 2009 (Chhattisgarh)
 Indian general election, 2014 (Chhattisgarh)

Branches of the government of Chhattisgarh 

Government of Chhattisgarh

Executive branch of the government of Chhattisgarh 

 Head of state: Governor of Chhattisgarh, 
 Head of government: Chief Minister of Chhattisgarh, 
 Council of Ministers of Chhattisgarh

Legislative branch of the government of Chhattisgarh 

Chhattisgarh Legislative Assembly
 Constituencies of Chhattisgarh Legislative Assembly

Judicial branch of the government of Chhattisgarh 

 High Court of Chhattisgarh

Law and order in Chhattisgarh 

 Law enforcement in Chhattisgarh
 Chhattisgarh Police

History of Chhattisgarh 

History of Chhattisgarh

History of Chhattisgarh, by period

Prehistoric Chhattisgarh

Ancient Chhattisgarh 

 Dakshina Kosala Kingdom

Medieval Chhattisgarh 
Haihaiyavanshi Kingdom

Colonial Chhattisgarh

Contemporary Chhattisgarh

History of Chhattisgarh, by region

History of Chhattisgarh, by subject

Culture of Chhattisgarh 

 Cuisine of Chhattisgarh
 Languages of Chhattisgarh
 Monuments in Chhattisgarh
 Monuments of National Importance in Chhattisgarh
 State Protected Monuments in Chhattisgarh
 World Heritage Sites in Chhattisgarh

Art in Chhattisgarh 
 Music of Chhattisgarh

Religion in Chhattisgarh 

Religion in Chhattisgarh
 Christianity in Chhattisgarh
 Hinduism in Chhattisgarh

Sports in Chhattisgarh 

Sports in Chhattisgarh
 Cricket in Chhattisgarh
 Chhattisgarh Cricket Association
 Chhattisgarh cricket team
 Football in Chhattisgarh
 Chhattisgarh Football Association
 Chhattisgarh football team

Symbols of Chhattisgarh 

Symbols of Chhattisgarh
 State animal:
 State bird: 
 State flower: 
 State symbol: 
 State tree: sal

Economy and infrastructure of Chhattisgarh 

 Tourism in Chhattisgarh

Education in Chhattisgarh 

Education in Chhattisgarh
 Institutions of higher education in Chhattisgarh

Health in Chhattisgarh 

Health in Chhattisgarh

See also 

 Outline of India

References

External links 

 Chhattisgarh News
 Chhattisgarh fact profile, by the India Brand Equity Foundation (IBEF)
 

Chhattisgarh
Chhattisgarh